Leal Arecibo Fútbol Club is a Puerto Rican association football club from Arecibo  that currently plays in the Liga Puerto Rico. It plays its home matches on the campus of the University of Puerto Rico at Arecibo.

History
Leal Arecibo FC was founded in 2006. It joined the nascent Liga Puerto Rico for the 2019/20 season which was eventually cancelled because of the COVID-19 pandemic.

Domestic history
Key

References

External links
Official Facebook profile
Liga Puerto Rico profile

Football clubs in Puerto Rico
Association football clubs established in 2006